Sergio Panzardo (born 20 July 1965) is a former Uruguayan professional football (soccer) player.

External links
Profile

1965 births
Living people
Uruguayan footballers
Uruguay international footballers
Peñarol players
C.A. Bella Vista players
Liverpool F.C. (Montevideo) players
Stade Malherbe Caen players
Ligue 1 players
Association football defenders